Gudrun Pausewang (3 March 1928 – 23 January 2020), less commonly known by her married name, Gudrun Wilcke,  was a German author of children's and young adult literature. She was known for books such as The Last Children of Schewenborn and Die Wolke (The Cloud, translated in the English book title as Fall-Out) which were made part of German school canons. Among her primary topics were work for peace and protection of the environment, namely warning of the alleged dangers of nuclear energy. Her books have been translated into English and received international recognition and awards.

Biography 
Pausewang was born in Wichstadtl (now Mladkov), Eastern Bohemia, a member of the German minority in Czechoslovakia. Her father was Siegfried Pausewang, and she was the eldest of six siblings. After the Nazis annexed the area, she became a Jungmädel at age 10 and remained in the organisation until age 17. Her father died in World War II, and her mother fled with the children to the West settling in Wiesbaden. Pausewang studied pedagogy and taught in German primary schools (Volksschule), then from 1956 for Germany's foreign school services in South America, in Chile, Venezuela and Columbia. She returned to Germany with her son in 1972. She lived in Schlitz, Hesse, where she taught until her retirement in 1989, and where she wrote most of her novels. After her retirement, she achieved her Ph.D. with a dissertation entitled "Vergessene Jugendschriftsteller der Erich-Kästner-Generation (Forgotten young-adult writers of Erich Kästner's generation).

Pausewang wrote around 100 novels. In 2011, she named as her four main topics:
 "We should never experience another war" ("Krieg und Frieden")
 "We should never have another dictatorship" ("Nie mehr Nationalsozialismus")
 "The poor conditions in South America" ("Armut in Südamerika")
 "Protecting nature" ("Schutz der Umwelt").

She wrote her novel Die Wolke (literally: The Cloud) in 1987, after the Chernobyl disaster, using information that the organisation "Ärzte gegen den Atomtod" (Physicians against nuclear death) had published at the end of the 1970s. In 1988, it was awarded the Deutscher Jugendliteraturpreis, the Kurd Laßwitz Award and the Deutscher Science Fiction Preis in the category Best Novel. It was translated as Fall-Out by Patricia Crampton and published in 1994. She wrote in 2011, after the Fukushima Daiichi nuclear disaster, that she was determined to take her readers serious regardless of age, and she wanted to warn of dangers of her time."

Her novel Dark Hours was included in the New York Public Library's 2007 list of Books for the Teen Age Reader, and in the Texas Library Association's 2007–2008 Tayshas High School Reading List, and received the Silver Medal in Juvenile/Young Adult Fiction from the Independent Publisher Book Awards.Announcing 2007 Independent Publisher Book Awards Results independentpublisher.com

Pausewang was awarded the Order of Merit of the Federal Republic of Germany. Several schools were named after her, and she received the Deutscher Jugendliteraturpreis for her life's work in 2017. Her books Die Wolke and Die letzten Kinder von Schewenhorn became part of required reading in schools, providing a formative and highly ambivalent reading experience shared by many West Germans born in the 1970s and 1980s.

From 2016, she lived in a senior citizens' home in Baunach, where she died on 23 January 2020.

 Publications 
Publications by Gudrung Pausewang (Gudrun Wilcke) are held by the German National Library, including:
  (1977)
  (1978)
 Die letzten Kinder von Schewenborn (1983) 
 Die Wolke (1987)
  (1989)
  (1992)
  (Roman, 1993)
 Die Kinder- und Jugendliteratur des Nationalsozialismus als Instrument ideologischer Beeinflussung. Liedertexte – Erzählungen und Romane – Schulbücher – Zeitschriften – Bühnenwerke (2005), published as Gudrun Wilcke

 Books in English 
 Fall-Out, a translation of Die Wolke, translated by Patricia Crampton, published by Viking (1994).
 The Final Journey, a translation of Reise im August by Patricia Crampton, published by Viking and Puffin Books.Traitor, translated by Rachel Ward, published by Lerner Publishing Group.Dark Hours'', translated by John Brownjohn, published in America through Annick Press (2006).

References

External links 

 
 Bites: Traitor by Gudrun Pausewang
 The Children's War: Traitor by Gudrun Pausewang, translated by Rachel Ward
 The Children's War: Dark Hours by Gudrun Pausewang, translated by John Brownjohn
 
 Gudrun Wilcke at LC Authorities, 2 records

1928 births
2020 deaths
German children's writers
German science fiction writers
Recipients of the Cross of the Order of Merit of the Federal Republic of Germany
Sudeten German people
German people of German Bohemian descent
People from Ústí nad Orlicí District
Women science fiction and fantasy writers
German women children's writers